Home Guards (Veszettek) is a 2015 Hungarian drama film.

It is one of the most expensive movies made in Hungary, with a budget of Euro 2.2 million. It was directed by 
Krisztina Goda.

Cast
Iván Fenyő	
	

Piroska Molnár	

Anna Györgyi
Attila Fritz
Bálint Bán
Ádám Béli
Oszkár Nyári

References

External links

2015 films
Hungarian drama films
Films directed by Krisztina Goda